Prime Evil is an original novel based on the U.S. television series Buffy the Vampire Slayer. Tagline: 'Infinity awaits an ancient evil'.

Plot summary

Crystal Gregory is a beautiful new teacher at Sunnydale High, who also happens to give Buffy panic fits whenever she's in the same room as her. Buffy can't sense anything unusual about the teacher and begins to wonder if she's losing her mind. But lately, Anya and Michael seem to be getting awfully close to Crystal and would appear to do anything for her. While out for her usual patrol at night, Buffy has two strange encounters; one, a man is completely incinerated by red and lighting and the other being a girl from school who has a burn mark on her neck in the shape of the symbol for infinity. As soon as Giles gets cracking on his books, he finds out that Crystal is in fact Shugra, a powerful primal witch which is trying to activate the source. She needs a coven of 13 willing people to participate in order to draw the proper energy, unfortunately, it seems that Willow is one of those people.

Cordelia is nervous about her father's tax position but does not tell the others. This foreshadows later events. Giles and Joyce are nervous in each other's company

Characters include: Buffy, Joyce, Giles, Xander, Anya, Cordelia, Willow, and Oz

Continuity
Late in Buffy season 3 but before "Earshot". Apart from a mistake over Angel's age, this book closely follows the Buffyverse's established 'canon'.

Canonical issues

Buffy novels such as this one are not usually considered by fans as canonical. Some fans consider them stories from the imaginations of authors and artists, while other fans consider them as taking place in an alternative fictional reality. However unlike fan fiction, overviews summarising their story, written early in the writing process, were 'approved' by both Fox and Joss Whedon (or his office), and the books were therefore later published as officially Buffy merchandise.

External links
Websites.cable.ntl.com - Watcher's Web interview about Buffy novels in general, Obsidian Fate and Prime Evil

Reviews
Litefoot1969.bravepages.com - Review of this book by Litefoot
Teen-books.com - Reviews of this book
Nika-summers.com - Review of this book by Nika Summers
Shadowcat.name - Review of this book

2000 novels
Books based on Buffy the Vampire Slayer